Commodore Decatur Airport is a closed airport located 2 miles west-northwest of Bainbridge, Georgia, United States.

History 
Built by the United States Army Air Forces around 1943, during World War II, the airport was used as an auxiliary training airfield for the Army pilot school at Bainbridge Army Airfield.

With the end of the war, it was turned over to the city of Donalsonville and developed into a municipal airport. It was closed around 1995.

Today, the closed airport is used every year for a Bikefest. Motorcycle clubs from all over the southeast show up for a week; they race on the strip and camp out.

The runway on the northwest is complete, with runway markers and lines still visible.

See also

 Georgia World War II Army Airfields

References 

 Abandoned Airports: Commodore Decatur Airport
 WWII Airfield Database - Georgia

External links 

Airports in Georgia (U.S. state)